This article discusses scientology and gender.

In his book Scientology: A New Slant on Life, Scientology founder L. Ron Hubbard wrote the following passage:

In the same book, he also wrote:

These passages, along with other ones of a similar nature from Hubbard, have been criticized by Alan Scherstuhl of The Village Voice as expressions of hatred towards women. However, Baylor University professor J. Gordon Melton has written that Hubbard later disregarded and abrogated much of his earlier views about women, which Melton views as merely echoes of common prejudices at the time. Melton has also stated that the Church of Scientology welcomes both genders equally at all levels—from leadership positions to auditing and so on—since Scientologists view people as spiritual beings.

The book Scientology: A History of Man by L. Ron Hubbard does not use gender-neutral language.

L. Ron Hubbard's discussion of abortion in his 1950 book Dianetics: The Modern Science of Mental Health states that abortion and attempts at abortion could cause trauma to the fetus and to the mother in both spiritual and physical ways. Scientologists came to believe that attempted abortions could cause traumatic experiences felt by the fetus, which would later be remembered as memories referred to in Scientology as "engrams". In the Scientology technique called Auditing, Scientologists are frequently queried regarding their sexual feelings and behaviors. These questions about Scientologists' sexual behavior are often posed to members during "security checks", a specific form of auditing sessions where individuals are required to document their divergence from the organization's ethics. One of the questions asked in these security checks is, "Have you ever been involved in an abortion?". In contrast, it has been alleged that if a woman gets pregnant while in the Scientologist organization called Sea Org, she will either be sent to a lower-level organization of Scientology, or be pressured to have an abortion.

The Traditional scientology wedding ceremony includes these remarks on men and women:
Now, (groom's name), girls need clothes and food and tender happiness and frills, a pan, a comb, perhaps a cat. All caprice if you will, but still they need them. Hear well, sweet (bride's name), for promise binds. Young men are free and may forget. Remind him then that you may have necessities and follies, too.

Silent birth, sometimes known as quiet birth, is a birthing procedure advised by L. Ron Hubbard and advocated by Scientologists in which "everyone attending the birth should refrain from spoken words as much as possible" and where "... chatty doctors and nurses, shouts to 'PUSH, PUSH' and loud or laughing remarks to 'encourage' are avoided". According to Scientology doctrine, this is because "any words spoken are recorded in the reactive mind and can have an aberrative effect on the mother and the child." There have been no attempts to prove this medically or scientifically.

Hubbard warned against sexual activity (including masturbation) during pregnancy, on premise that sexual activity during pregnancy could damage fetal development, as by producing engrams detrimental to future activity. This view is disputed by some doctors, as Paulette Cooper commented in her book The Scandal of Scientology:

These same beliefs form the basis for Hubbard's Silent birth doctrine. According to a Scientology manual on raising children,  a couple should be silent before and after coition.

Roy Wallis, in 1976 wrote in The Road to Total Freedom that the Scientologist population was 59% male and 41% female, a number referenced on The Auditor, a publication of the Church of Scientology. In 1988, a participant observer study from the University of Copenhagen showed that the average participant in the Church of Scientology Copenhagen was a 35-year-old man. Though the numbers are not great in disparity, “they provide non-census evidence supporting the contention that more men than women become member of CoS,” Tollefson and Lewis write.

See also
 Scientology and abortion
 Scientology and marriage
 Scientology and sex
 Silent birth

References

Scientology beliefs and practices